UMBI or Umbi may refer to:

 Usa Marine Biological Institute, Japan
 University of Maryland Biotechnology Institute, U.S.
UKM Medical Molecular Biology Institute, National University of Malaysia
Mount Umbi, Kurmuk (woreda), Ethiopia
"Umbi", track on 2001 album Kristnihald undir Jökli by Quarashi
Umbi Films, production company of Gurinder Chadha